Paulo Scott (born 8 December 1966) is a Brazilian author, poet, playwright, screenwriter and translator.

He studied law at Pontifical Catholic University of Rio Grande do Sul (PUCRS-RG).

He has received numerous awards including the Prêmio Fundação Biblioteca Nacional, and been shortlisted for renowned prizes like the Prêmio Jabuti and the Prêmio São Paulo de Literatura. His short story collection Still Orangutans was adapted into a movie and won the Milano Film Festival in 2008.

In 2014, his novel Nowhere People was published in English (trans. Daniel Hahn) by And Other Stories. It was featured on World Literature Today’s list of ‘Notable Translations in 2014’. His following book Phenotypes, was longlisted to the 2022 International Booker Prize.

He currently lives in Rio de Janeiro.

References 

1966 births
Living people
20th-century Brazilian dramatists and playwrights
Brazilian screenwriters
Brazilian translators
People from Porto Alegre
20th-century Brazilian short story writers
20th-century Brazilian novelists
20th-century Brazilian male writers
21st-century Brazilian dramatists and playwrights
21st-century Brazilian short story writers
21st-century Brazilian novelists
21st-century Brazilian male writers
Brazilian male dramatists and playwrights
Brazilian male short story writers
Brazilian male novelists